John Gerin may refer to:
 John L. Gerin, American virologist
 John E. Gerin, American prison physician

See also
 John Guerin, American percussionist